The Swalley Irrigation District supplies water to irrigators through a network of pipes and canals fed by the Deschutes River near Bend in the U.S. state of Oregon. The only covered bridge east of the Cascade Range in Oregon crosses the Swalley Canal.

The district diverts about 82 CFS from the river during the irrigation season, April through October. Water requirements for Swalley have fallen by about 43 CFS over the years due to major water conservation projects and other efficiency projects and programs. Water savings from conservation projects means that more water stays in the river, where increased flow improves conditions for redband trout and other biological species. The district operates a small in-conduit hydroelectric plant that generates renewable energy from the water it diverts for irrigation purposes.

History
The irrigation district was formed in 1899 as the Deschutes Reclamation and Irrigation Company (DRIC). In 1994, when shareholders in the company decided to incorporate as an irrigation district, they adopted the name Swalley Irrigation District after two resident families named Swalley who helped form and manage the DRIC. One of the Swalleys became the project leader and helped build the flumes that carried "Swalley water".

Description

The district lies generally between U.S. Route 20 on the west and U.S. Route 97 on the east. 

Water enters the system from behind the North Canal Dam on the Deschutes River in Bend. For its first , the water flows through pressurized pipe. In 2010, the district completed the piping and the addition of an in-conduit 0.75-megawatt hydroelectric plant. The plant produces enough electricity to supply about 375 homes and businesses near Bend's Old Mill District. Annual income to the district from selling electricity is estimated between $160,000 and $190,000. Grants from other agencies had covered all but $2 million of the $14.5 million cost to build the plant, which has an expected lifespan of 50 to 100 years.

The canal delivers water another  beyond the hydroelectric plant but does not discharge to a storage reservoir or any natural water body. It is a closed system with no end-spills or returns to the Deschutes River. Advanced Fish and Debris Screens prevent fish from entering the Main Canal Pipeline at the headworks.

The average customer in the district receives enough water to irrigate . The most common crops are grass and alfalfa, and some customers use the water for oats, shrubs, pine trees, wine grapes, nursery stock, conservation materials, industrial hemp, schoolground sports fields, parks, and other vegetation.

Conservation
The district began converting open canals to pipelines in the early 21st century to prevent water loss to leaks and evaporation. The increased flow along the Middle Deschutes improved conditions for life forms, such as the redband trout, that live in the river.

Earlier piping on lateral canals in the Swalley system and the nearby Central Oregon Irrigation District had already reduced diversions from the river totaling  during the irrigation season, April through October. The piping proceeded despite objections from homeowners who unsuccessfully sued to keep the canal open on grounds that their property values would fall if the surface stream were replaced by a pipe.

Bridge
The Rock O' the Range Bridge, the only covered bridge in Oregon that lies east of the Cascade Range, carries Bowery Lane over the canal. In 1963, a developer had the bridge built to provide access to his property. Land owners in the development pay to maintain the public bridge, one of only a few privately-funded covered bridges built in recent decades.

Coordinates
The Geographic Names Information System lists two sets of coordinates for the Swalley Canal.

References

External links

1899 establishments in Oregon
Buildings and structures in Deschutes County, Oregon
Canals in Oregon
Irrigation Districts of the United States
Geography of Oregon